Foster is a town in Providence County, Rhode Island, in the United States. The population was 4,469 at the 2020 census.

History 

Foster was originally settled in the 17th century by British colonists as a farming community. In the year 1662, William Vaughan, Zachariah Rhodes, and Robert Wescott, purchased from the Indians a large tract of land called West Quanaug, bordering on Providence. The 'West Quanaug purchase' included nearly the whole southern half of the town of Foster. The first English settler was allegedly Ezekiel Hopkins. Many settlers from Newport were active in the town in the 18th century. Shortly before the incorporation of the town, Foster's first church, a Calvinist Baptist congregation was founded. Shortly afterwards, Six Principle Baptist and Free Will Baptist congregations were founded.

Foster was incorporated with Scituate, Rhode Island in 1730, forming the western section of that township, and remained part of Scituate until 1781, when it was split off as a distinct and separate township. Foster derived its name from U.S. Senator Theodore Foster. Mr. Foster presented the town with a library. Some of the library's original books and town records are still preserved. U.S. Senator Nelson Aldrich was born in Foster in 1841. Senator Aldrich was instrumental in starting the U.S. Federal Reserve Board.

In the 1920s the Ku Klux Klan was active in the area. The largest Klan rally north of the Mason–Dixon line was held in Foster on the Old Home Day grounds in 1924 with 8,000 in attendance and U.S. Senator J. Thomas Heflin of Alabama speaking. Foster remained a bastion of racial and religious bigotry for more than half a century.

Geography 

Foster contains Rhode Island's highest point, Jerimoth Hill, with an elevation of 248 m (812 ft).

Climate 

Climate in this area has mild differences between highs and lows, and there is adequate rainfall year-round. According to the Köppen Climate Classification system, Foster has an Oceanic climate, abbreviated "Cfb" on climate maps.

Demographics 

As of the census of 2000, there were 4,274 people, 1,535 households, and 1,198 families residing in the town. The racial makeup of the town was 97.26% White, 0.21% African American, 0.23% Native American, 0.58% Asian, 0.09% Pacific Islander, 0.26% from other races, and 1.36% from two or more races. Hispanic or Latino of any race were 0.80% of the population. Foster's zip code, 02825, has a significantly larger population than the town of Foster. This is because the zip code extends into parts of the more populated town of Scituate, Rhode Island.

There were 1,535 households, out of which 36.0% had children under the age of 18 living with them, 68.5% were married couples living together, 6.8% had a female householder with no husband present, and 21.9% were non-families. 17.1% of all households were made up of individuals, and 6.3% had someone living alone who was 65 years of age or older. The average household size was 2.77 and the average family size was 3.14.

In the town, the population was spread out, with 25.9% under the age of 18, 5.6% from 18 to 24, 29.1% from 25 to 44, 28.9% from 45 to 64, and 10.5% who were 65 years of age or older. The median age was 40 years. For every 100 females, there were 99.6 males. For every 100 females age 18 and over, there were 97.6 males.

The median income for a household in the town was $59,673, and the median income for a family was $63,657. Males had a median income of $39,808 versus $30,632 for females. The per capita income for the town was $22,148. About 1.5% of families and 3.4% of the population were below the poverty line, including 2.9% of those under age 18 and 7.8% of those age 65 or over.

Education
Foster's Capt. Isaac Paine Elementary School, has the top spot for reading proficiency according to the New England Common Assessment Program, or NECAP, exams. 82 percent of its students attained proficiency, the state leader in that testing category.

Arts and culture

Tourism 

Foster is home to the Foster Town House. Built in 1796 and in use to this day, the Foster Town House is the oldest government meeting house of its type in the United States. Foster also contains Rhode Island's only authentic covered bridge, the Swamp Meadow Covered Bridge. Built in 1994 by Jed Dixon, a Foster resident, it is a reproduction of an early-19th-century specimen. It is the only covered bridge in Rhode Island located on a public road. Jerimoth Hill, the highest point of elevation in Rhode Island, is located in Foster.

Notable people 

 Nelson Aldrich, US senator from Rhode Island; father of Abby Rockefeller; born in Foster
 Solomon Drowne, physician and author; confidante of Theodore Foster; lived in Foster on a farm named Mount Hygeia
 Theodore Foster, US senator from Rhode Island; the town of Foster is named after him 
 Clarke Howard Johnson, Thide Island legislator and state supreme court justice
 Albert W. Hicks, One of the last persons executed for piracy in the United States

Historic Places in Foster

Foster Center Historic District
Breezy Hill Site (RI-957)
Clayville Historic District
Capt. George Dorrance House (1720)
Moosup Valley Historic District
Mount Vernon Tavern (1761)
Mt. Hygeia (1808)
Line Baptist Church  (1867)

See also

Notes

References

External links

 
 Foster History
 Town of Foster, RI
 Foster Preservation Society
 South Foster Volunteer Fire Company
 City-Data.com
	

 
Towns in Providence County, Rhode Island
Providence metropolitan area
Towns in Rhode Island